Leonidas Njunwa (born 2 August 1952) is a Tanzanian boxer. He competed in the men's light middleweight event at the 1980 Summer Olympics.

References

1952 births
Living people
Tanzanian male boxers
Olympic boxers of Tanzania
Boxers at the 1980 Summer Olympics
Commonwealth Games competitors for Tanzania
Boxers at the 1982 Commonwealth Games
Place of birth missing (living people)
Light-middleweight boxers